Strigosella is a genus of mollusks belonging to the family Trochidae.

Strigosella is a junior objective synonym of Scrobiculinus Monterosato, 1889, a synonym of Steromphala Gray, 1847 

The species of this genus are found in Australia and Europe.

Species:
 Strigosella lepida (Philippi, 1846): synonym of Cantharidus lepidus (Philippi, 1849)

References

External links
 Sacco, F. (1896). I molluschi dei terreni terziarii del Piemonte e della Liguria. Parte XXI. (Naricidae, Modulidae, Phasianellidae, Turbinidae, Delphinulidae, Cyclostrematidae, Tornidae). Carlo Clausen, Torino, 64 pp., 4 pl.

Trochidae